Bernard A. Larger (1865 – June 23, 1928) was an American labor union leader.

Born in Drinkwater, Massachusetts, Larger moved to Cincinnati in 1885, where he worked as a garment cutter.  He joined the United Garment Workers of America, and was elected as its president in 1897, serving for a single year.  He was re-elected in 1900, serving until 1904, when he moved to become the union's general secretary.

Larger had a strong relationship with Samuel Gompers, leader of the American Federation of Labor, and represented the federation at several overseas conferences.

References

1865 births
1928 deaths
American trade union leaders
People from Hanover, Massachusetts
Trade unionists from Massachusetts